"Number One" is the third single released from R&B singer John Legend's album Get Lifted. It features Kanye West and contains a sample of the song "Let's Do It Again" by The Staple Singers. It is a hip hop and R&B song.

Track listing

CD maxi-single
 "Number One" (Clean Edit) (featuring Kanye West) - 3:20
 "Number One" (featuring Kanye West) - 3:20
 "Number One" (Instrumental) - 3:29
 "Number One" (Clean Edit, Acapella, No Rap) - 2:43

Charts

References

2005 singles
GOOD Music singles
John Legend songs
Kanye West songs
Song recordings produced by Kanye West
Songs written by John Legend